Bruce "JoJo" Natson Jr. (born February 1, 1994) is an American football wide receiver and return specialist who is currently a free agent. He played college football at Utah State and Akron.

Kids Clover Natson

College career 
Natson played for three seasons at Utah State where he is tied for first all-time in both Utah State and Mountain West history with four punt returns for touchdowns. After multiple violations of team rules Natson was dismissed from the Utah State football team. Natson transferred to Akron where he played his senior season.

Professional career

Indianapolis Colts
Natson was signed by the Indianapolis Colts as an undrafted free agent on May 4, 2017. He was waived by the Colts on September 2, 2017.

New York Jets
On September 4, 2017, Natson was signed to the New York Jets' practice squad. He was promoted to the active roster on November 11, 2017. He was waived by the Jets on April 27, 2018.

Los Angeles Rams
On July 24, 2018, Natson signed with the Los Angeles Rams. He was waived on August 31, 2018. On September 12, 2018, Natson re-signed with the Rams after Pharoh Cooper was placed on injured reserve with an ankle injury.

On December 3, 2019, Natson was again placed on injured reserve with a hamstring injury, ending his season.

On March 10, 2020, Natson was waived by the Rams.

Cleveland Browns
On March 24, 2020, Natson signed a one-year, $1 million contract with the Cleveland Browns. He was placed on injured reserve on September 28, 2020 after suffering a torn ACL in Week 3.

On March 19, 2021, Natson re-signed with the Browns. The Browns terminated Natson's contract on August 31, 2021. Natson was re-signed to the Browns' practice squad on September 1, 2021. Natson was elevated to the Browns' active roster on November 13, 2021, and reverted to the practice squad the following day. Natson was elevated to the active roster again on December 11, 2021. Natson was waived by the Browns on December 28, 2021.

NFL statistics

References

External links

 Utah State Aggies bio
 Akron Zips bio

1994 births
Living people
American football wide receivers
Players of American football from Fort Lauderdale, Florida
Utah State Aggies football players
Akron Zips football players
Indianapolis Colts players
New York Jets players
Los Angeles Rams players
Cleveland Browns players